Kazan metropolitan area is one of the largest areas, located in Russia, which includes the cities and districts of Tatarstan and Mari El republics:
Cities: Kazan, Zelenodolsk, Volzhsk;
Districts (rayons) of Tatarstan: Atninsky, Verkhneuslonsky, Verkhneuslonsky, Zelenodolsky, Laishevsky, Pestrechinsky;
Districts (rayons) of Mari El: Volzhsky, Zvenigovsky.

Population is 1,703,037 people (Census 2020).

References 

Metropolitan areas of Russia
Geography of Russia